is a Japanese rugby union player. He was named in Japan's squad for the 2015 Rugby World Cup.

References

External links
 Top League Profile, in Japanese
 Suntory Sungoliath Profile, in Japanese
 

1987 births
Living people
Japanese rugby union players
Japan international rugby union players
Sportspeople from Sendai
Tokyo Sungoliath players
Rugby union locks
Rugby union flankers
Sunwolves players